The Chief of the Austrian General Staff is the highest-ranking military officer in the Austrian Armed Forces and is responsible for maintaining control over the service branches.

List of chiefs of the general staff

Army Inspectors (1922–1937)

General Inspectors of Troops (1956–2002)

Chiefs of the General Staff (2002–present)

See also
Austro-Hungarian General Staff
Supreme Commander of the Imperial and Royal Armed Forces

Notes

References

Military of Austria
Austrian military personnel
Austria